Richard Ray (4 February 1876 – 28 December 1952) was an English professional footballer and manager.

A left-back, he played for Macclesfield, before starting his career in the Football League with Burslem Port Vale in 1894. He switched to Crewe Alexandra a year later, before joining Manchester City in 1896. He spent the next four years with City, helping the club to the Second Division title in 1898–99. He spent time with Macclesfield and Coventry City, before spending one season each with Stockport County and Chesterfield. He signed with Leeds City in July 1905, and captained the club before he left the club in March 1908.

In 1919, he became Leeds United's first ever manager, before being demoted to Arthur Fairclough's assistant the following year. He took charge at Doncaster Rovers in 1923, and spent four seasons in charge, before returning to Leeds in 1927. He led the club to promotion out of the Second Division in 1927–28 and 1931–32, though he failed to turn Leeds into a stable First Division side. He took the reins at Bradford City in 1935, but left his post in February 1937.

Playing career
Ray was born in Newcastle-under-Lyme, and began his footballing career with local club Audley, before joining Macclesfield in 1893, with whom he won the Cheshire Senior Cup. He joined Burslem Port Vale in 1894. He was a solid performer for the club, however failed to turn up for one match after misreading a train timetable, and was fined five shillings for his trouble. In total he played 29 of the club's 30 Second Division games in the 1894–95 season, and scored his first goal in the Football League on 2 February, in a 2–1 defeat to Manchester City at the Athletic Ground. He departed in the summer of 1895. He spent the 1895–96 season with Crewe Alexandra, but did not make a first team appearance. He instead returned to Macclesfield, picking up a second Cheshire Senior Cup winners medal.

Ray went on to play 30 Second Division games for Manchester City in the 1896–97 season, and scored one goal in a 5–0 win at Walsall on 6 January. He made 22 appearances in the 1897–98 campaign, and scored a goal in a 1–1 draw with Manchester derby rivals Newton Heath at Bank Street on 16 October. He played 26 matches in the 1898–99 season, and scored one goal in a 5–0 victory over Loughborough at Hyde Road on 17 December, as City won promotion as champions of the Second Division. He played only nine First Division games in the 1899–1900 season. He later played for non-league clubs Macclesfield and Coventry City, before making 34 Second Division appearances for Stockport County in the 1903–04 season. He left Edgeley Park after Stockport failed re-election to the Football League. He spent the 1904–05 campaign with Chesterfield, playing 31 Second Division games.

After Gilbert Gillies, his manager at Saltergate, was appointed as Leeds City's first manager in March 1905, Ray followed him to Elland Road in July 1905. The club had just been elected to the Second Division and Ray played the club's first-ever Football League appearance in a 1–0 defeat to Bradford City at Valley Parade in September 1905. He played 38 League and six FA Cup games as captain at Elland Road, before leaving the club when the board declined to renew Gillies' contract in March 1908.

Managerial career

Leeds United
Ray retired from playing in 1912 and then served in the Royal Army Service Corps during World War I. He was invited to become a member of the original committee that was elected to manage the new Leeds United following Leeds City's expulsion from the Football League in October 1919. He was appointed the club's first manager in the 1919–20 Midland League season, before Arthur Fairclough was appointed as his successor. Ray worked as Fairclough's assistant, before leaving Elland Road in June 1923.

Doncaster Rovers
He was appointed as Doncaster Rovers manager for the 1923–24 season, and led "Donny" to ninth in the Third Division North in the club's first season back in the Football League. Rovers struggled to finish 18th in 1924–25, just three places and six points above the re-election zone. He then took them to tenth and eighth-place finishes in 1925–26 and 1926–27. At Belle Vue he signed four members of the Keetley family: Tom, Harry, Joe and Frank.

Return to Leeds
When Arthur Fairclough resigned following Leeds United's relegation into the Second Division at the end of 1926–27, the Leeds board recalled Ray as manager in July 1927. Described as "an outspoken character", he developed Bert Sproston, Billy Furness, Eric Stephenson, Arthur Hydes, Tom Cochrane, George Milburn and Jim Milburn into key players for the club. He also signed Charlie Keetley in July 1927, who would go on to become the club's most prolific goalscorer. He installed an all-England international half-back line of Willis Edwards, Ernest Hart and Wilf Copping.

Ray led Leeds United to promotion in 1927–28 with a second-place finish, just two points behind champions Manchester City. United finished 13th in the First Division in 1928–29, before rising to fifth place in 1929–30. He then took the "Peacocks" to relegation in 21st place in 1930–31. He succeeded in taking the club to immediate promotion in 1931–32, as they finished in second position, just two points behind champions Wolverhampton Wanderers. He then took them to eighth spot in 1932–33 and ninth place in 1933–34. Yet with Wilf Copping sold to Arsenal, Leeds fell to 18th place in 1934–35. Ray resigned in March 1935, with Leeds struggling against relegation.

Bradford City
After Ray left Elland Road, he became Bradford City manager in April 1935. The "Bantams" finished 12th in the Second Division in 1935–36. However, he left his post at Valley Parade in February 1937, with the club sliding towards relegation in 1936–37.

The Football League appointed Ray as the first manager of a Football League representative team, for a 2–2 draw with the Scottish League at Ibrox in February 1938. He later worked as chief scout at Millwall, and later ran a garage business and billiard clubs.

Career statistics

Playing statistics
Source:

Managerial statistics

Honours
Macclesfield
Cheshire Senior Cup: 1894 & 1896

Manchester City
Football League Second Division: 1898–99

Leeds United
Football League Second Division second-place promotion: 1927–28 & 1931–32

References
General
 
Specific

Sportspeople from Newcastle-under-Lyme
English footballers
Association football fullbacks
Macclesfield Town F.C. players
Port Vale F.C. players
Crewe Alexandra F.C. players
Manchester City F.C. players
Coventry City F.C. players
Stockport County F.C. players
Chesterfield F.C. players
Leeds City F.C. players
Midland Football League players
English Football League players
Royal Army Service Corps soldiers
English football managers
Leeds United F.C. managers
Doncaster Rovers F.C. managers
Bradford City A.F.C. managers
English Football League managers
Association football coaches
Association football scouts
1876 births
1952 deaths
British Army personnel of World War I